The 1994 season of the Ukrainian Championship was the 3rd season of Ukraine's women's football competitions. The championship ran from 22 April 1994 to 19 October 1994.

Before the start many clubs withdrew from the league and both Higher and First leagues were merged.

Teams

Team changes

Name changes
 Donetsk-Ros last season was called Tekstylnyk Donetsk
 Iunisa Kyiv last season was located in Luhansk
 Kraianka Kirovohrad last season was called Mria Kirovohrad
 Esmira Luhansk last season was called Kontek Luhansk
 Kolos Kherson last season was called Hart-Tavria Kherson

Higher League

League table

Top scorers

References

External links
WFPL.ua
Women's Football.ua

1994
1993–94 in Ukrainian association football leagues
1994–95 in Ukrainian association football leagues
Ukrainian Women's League
Ukrainian Women's League